Emma Golijanin (born 15 April 1992) is a Bosnian beauty queen, model and actress. She represented Bosnia and Herzegovina in the Miss Earth 2010 World Final held in Vietnam.

References

External links

Living people
1992 births
Bosnia and Herzegovina beauty pageant winners
Bosnia and Herzegovina female models
Bosnia and Herzegovina actresses